Slovenian cuisine is influenced by the diversity of Slovenia's landscape, climate, history and neighbouring cultures. In 2016, the leading Slovenian ethnologists divided the country into 24 gastronomic regions.  
The first Slovene-language cookbook was published by Valentin Vodnik in 1798.

Foods and dishes

Soups are a relatively recent invention in Slovenian cuisine, but there are over 100. Earlier there were various kinds of porridge, stew and one-pot meals. The most common soups without meat were lean and plain. A typical dish is aleluja, a soup made from turnip peels and a well-known dish during fasting. The most common meat soup is beef soup with noodles, which is often served on Sunday as part of a Sunday lunch (beef soup, fried potatoes, fried steak and lettuce). On feast days and holidays there is often a choice of beef noodle soup or creamy mushroom soup.
Pork is popular and common everywhere in Slovenia. Poultry is also often popular. There is a wide variety of meats in different parts of Slovenia. In White Carniola and the Slovenian Littoral mutton and goat are eaten. On St. Martin's Day people feast on roasted goose, duck, turkey, or chicken paired with red cabbage and mlinci. In Lower Carniola and Inner Carniola, they used to eat roasted dormouse and quail. Until the crayfish plague in the 1880s the noble crayfish was a source of income and often on the menu in Lower Carniola and Inner Carniola.

Dandelion is popular as a salad ingredient in Slovenia and has been gathered in the fields for centuries. Even today dandelion and potato salad is highly valued. Since it can be picked only for a short time in early spring, much is made of it. Families go on dandelion picking expeditions, and pick enough for a whole week. In the Middle Ages people ate acorns and other forest fruits, particularly in times of famine. Chestnuts were valued, and served as the basis for many outstanding dishes. Walnuts and hazelnuts are used in cakes and desserts. Wild strawberries, loganberries, blackberries, bilberries were a rich source of vitamins. Mushrooms have always been popular, and Slovenians liked picking and eating them. There are many varieties. Honey was used to a considerable extent. Medenjaki, which come in different shapes are honey cakes, which are most commonly heart-shaped and are often used as gifts.

Protected foodstuffs and food products 

, near Piran
, twenty-four Slovenian foods and food products are protected at the European level:
 prleška tünka, a product from Prlekija in eastern Slovenia, made of minced lard and pork.
 Ptuj onion, a sort of onion of a cordate shape, with red inspiration, whereas the edge has a more intensive purple hue.
 extra virgin olive oil from the Slovenian Istria, a little bitter and spicy oil with a strong fruit aroma, produced in the Slovenian Istria, contains a large amount of oleic acid and biphenols.
 Nanos cheese, made of cow milk, hard, with small holes in the size of peas, a little sweet and spicy.
 Kočevje forest honey, produced in the wider Kočevje area.
 zgornjesavinjski želodec, an air-dried meat product from the Upper Savinja Valley, made of high-quality bacon and pork meat, filled in pig stomach.
 šebreljski želodec, produced in the areas around Cerkno and Idrija, made of high-quality bacon and pork meat, filled in pig stomach.
 Tolminc cheese, made of raw cow milk in the area of Tolmin, tastes sweet and spicy.
 Karst prosciutto, produced in the traditional way on the Karst Plateau in southwestern Slovenia.
 Karst cured neck meat, a cylindrically-shaped meat product from the cured pork neck meat in a casing.
 Bovec cheese, firm sheep cheese from area around Bovec near Soča river.
 Steyer - Prekmurje pumpkin oil, dark coloured pumpkin oil derived from pumpkin seed.
 Karst honey, honey gathered exclusively on Karst Plateau.
 Mohant , cow milk soft cheese with strong smell, picant, sometimes bitter taste.
 Slovenian honey, honey gathered exclusively on the territory of Slovenia.
 Prekmurje ham, ham from Prekmurje.
 Salt from Piran, salt gathered manually form salt fields on Slovenian coast near Piran.
 Carniolian sausage, usually cooked sausage from pork and bacon.
 Istra Prosciutto**, uncooked, unsmoked, and dry-cured ham from Istria.
 Stayer Hop is a small genus of flowering plants in the family Cannabaceae, needed for beer production.
 Kamnik eggs, eggs from area under Kamnik Alps in central Slovenia.
 meat from boškarin cattle**, meat from specific Istrian cattle.

** shared with Croatia

Traditional Slovenian dishes

 Ajdovi žganci
 Belokranjska povitica
 Bujta repa
 Funšterc
 Kmečka pojedina
 Kranjska klobasa
 Matevž
 Mavželj
 Mežerli
 Mineštra (minestrone)
 Obara (stew)
 Pirh
 Potica (nut roll)
 Prekmurska gibanica
 Ričet
 Špehovka
 Vipavska jota

Soups and stews 

 Bakalca
 Bobiči
 Bograč
 Jota, Vipavska kisla juha, Vipava sour soup
 Mineštra
 Prežganka is Slovenian national soup made of flour, caraway seeds and beaten eggs
 Šara
 Štajerska kisla juha is a sour soup that originates from Lower Styria. It's prepared at the feast of koline (pig slaughter) from the pork pettitoes and parts of the pig's head.

Vegetarian dishes

 Ajdovi žganci, žganci is a dish in Slovenian cuisine. It's similar to polenta, although prepared with finer grains. Balthasar Hacquet (1739–1815) mentions that žganci was served with sauerkraut in Upper Carniola.
 Aleluja
 Bezgovo cvrtje
 Čompe
 Fritaja (see also frittata) is a Croatian and Slovenian dish. Both are specialties in Istria. They are especially common in the springtime, as at that time there are many plants and vegetables such as wild asparagus, wild hops, herbs, chicory, tomatoes, young garlic sprouts and spices available to add to egg. Fritaje are many times prepared throughout the year with ham, mushrooms, sausages, bacon, white or red wine.
 Idrijski žlikrofi
 Jabolčna čežana
 Kaša is a dish commonly eaten in Eastern Europe. At least a thousand years old, kasha is one of the oldest known dishes in Eastern European Slavic cuisine.
 Krapi
 Maslovnik
 Matevž
 Medla
 Mešta
 Močnik is made from cereals such as buckwheat, maize, wheat, millet, rye, or oats in either milk, cream or soured cream.
 Njoki
 Smojka
 Štruklji

Meat dishes

 Budelj
 Bujta repa
 Bunka (food)
 Furešna
 Jetrnice (liver sausage)
 Kranjska klobasa (Carniola sausage)
 Krvavice (black pudding)
 Mavta
 Mavželj
 Meso v tünki
 Mežerli
 Povijaka
 Prata
 Pršut (prosciutto)
 Šivanka
 Švacet
 Vampi (Tripe)
 Zaseka
 Želodec (stomach)

Desserts and pastries

 Bobi
 Buhteljni
 Cmoki
 Hajdinjača
 Kremsnita
 Krhki flancati
 Krofi
 Kvasenica
 Miške
 Mlinci
 Ocvirkovica
 Pinca
 Pogača
 Posolanka
 Povitica or Potica (nut roll)
 Prekmurska gibanica
 Šarkelj
 Škofjeloški kruhek
 Špehovka (bacon roll)
 Vrtanek
 Zlevanka

Drinks

 Brinjevec
 Borovničke
 Jabolčnik (apple wine)
 Češnjevec (cherry brandy)
 Cviček (Slovenian wine from Dolenjska region)
 Teran (Slovenian wine from Primorska region)
 Kislo mleko (sour milk)
 Šabesa
 Slivovka, Slivovica
 Tolkovec
 Tropinovec
 Pinjenec (buttermilk) 
Union beer 
Laško/Zlatorog beer

References

 
Cuisine
Mediterranean cuisine